Truly Semiconductors Ltd is a company producing LCD panels and modules, established in 1991 with its headquarters in Hong Kong and manufacturing grounds in Shanwei, Guangdong, China.

Overview
Truly Semiconductors Ltd manufactures LCDs, in panel, module, compact camera modules and touch panels for different industries like Automotive, Medical, Industrial, Defense, telecommunication etc...

References

Display technology companies
Manufacturing companies established in 1991
Companies based in Guangdong
1991 establishments in Hong Kong
Companies listed on the Hong Kong Stock Exchange
Hong Kong brands